The Lehigh Valley Outlawz were a professional indoor football team based in Bethlehem, Pennsylvania. The team began play as a semi-pro team in the Labelle Community Football League as the Philly Outlawz. The team was later a charter member of the Great Lakes Indoor Football League joining the league in 2006 as an expansion team. The Outlawz and the Reading Express were the first professional indoor football team to be based in Lehigh Valley. The Outlawz were owned by Jim DePaul. They played their home games at the Stabler Arena on the campus of Lehigh University in Bethlehem, Pennsylvania.

Franchise history

2004–2005
Prior to joining indoor football, they were a semi-pro team from the Labelle Community Football League known as the Philly Outlawz. They played in the league from 2004 to 2005.

2006: Turning pro
In 2006, the Outlawz made the jump to professional status when they joined the Great Lakes Indoor Football League. During their inaugural year, the Outlawz hosted the first, and only, GLIFL All-Star Game. They ended their regular season at 5-5 which was good enough to clinch the number 3 playoff spot. In the playoffs, they were eliminated by the second-seeded Rochester Raiders in the semifinals.

Standings

2007
In 2007, the Outlawz would finish the season with a 7-5 record which, would again earn them the number 3 seed in the Atlantic Division playoffs. They went on to lose in the semifinal round of the playoffs to the New England Surge.

Schedule

Standings

2008
The Outlawz would finish the 2008 regular season with a 6-5 record and the #2 seed in the Atlantic Division East.  The team would take a big step in winning their first playoff game against the New England Surge before being defeated by the Saginaw Sting in the Atlantic Division Championship.

Schedule

Standings

Demise
After the 2008 season the Outlawz, along with the New England Surge left the CIFL and planned to start their own league, the United States Indoor Football League.  Later three more teams, the Southland (IL) Chill, the Bridgeview Red Devils, and the Pennsylvania Stillers were announced as participants in the newly formed league.  The team had stated that the season would start in March, around the same time that its previous seasons had begun.  However, the start was then pushed back to April, then May and a final announcement was made that the 2009 schedule would be out June 1.  The schedule never came out and the team and league website stopped being updated.  The team shut down their Hellertown, Pennsylvania headquarters.  The league website stated that it (the USIFL) was based out of Cape Coral, Florida, however, the USIFL decided it was best to not try and start a new league venture with the US economy in its current condition. Rumors of unpaid player and accounts were never confirmed and a lawsuit brought by a former coach was dismissed without merit.

Season-by-season 

|-
| colspan="6" align="center" | Philly Outlawz (LCFL)
|-
|2004 || 9 || 4 || 0 || 2nd D Division || Lost Round 1 (Claymont)
|-
|2005 || 9 || 1 || 1 || 1st League || Won Round 1 (Eastwick)Won Semifinal (Claymont)Lost LaBelle Bowl II (Frankford)
|-
| colspan="6" align="center" | Lehigh Valley Outlawz (GLIFL)
|-
|2006 || 5 || 5 || 0 || 3rd League || Lost Semifinals (Rochester)
|-
| colspan="6" align="center" | Lehigh Valley Outlawz (CIFL)
|-
|2007 || 7 || 5 || 0 || 3rd Atlantic || Lost AD Semifinal (New England)
|-
|2008 || 6 || 5 || 0 || 2nd Atlantic East || Won AD East Finals (New England)Lost AD Championship (Saginaw)
|-
| colspan="6" align="center" | Lehigh Valley Outlawz (USIFL)
|-
|2009 || -- || -- || -- || -- || --
|-
!Totals || 37 || 21 || 1
|colspan="2"| (including LCFL, GLIFL, and CIFL playoffs)

External links
 Official website
 Outlawz' 2006 stats
 Outlawz' 2007 stats
 Outlawz' 2004 LBCFL stats
 Outlawz' 2005 LBCFL stats

Former Continental Indoor Football League teams
Sports in Bethlehem, Pennsylvania
Defunct American football teams in Pennsylvania
American football teams established in 2006
American football teams disestablished in 2008
2006 establishments in Pennsylvania
2008 disestablishments in Pennsylvania